Kaisa Nyberg is a Finnish cryptographer and computer security researcher.

Contributions
Nyberg's research includes the theory of perfect nonlinear S-boxes (now known as Nyberg S-boxes), provably secure block cipher design (resulting in KN-Cipher, and the cryptanalysis of the stream ciphers E0 and SNOW.

Education and career
Nyberg received her Ph.D. in mathematics in 1980 from the University of Helsinki. Her dissertation, On Subspaces of Products of Nuclear Fréchet Spaces, was in topology, and was supervised by Edward Leonard Dubinsky.

Nyberg began doing cryptography research for the Finnish Defence Forces in 1987, and moved to Nokia in 1998. She became professor of cryptology at Aalto University School of Science in 2005, and retired as a professor emerita in 2016.

Selected publications

References

External links
 Kaisa Nyberg's page at TKK
 

Living people
Modern cryptographers
Computer security academics
Finnish mathematicians
Women mathematicians
1948 births